Hugo Mario Lepe Gajardo (14 April 1940 – 4 July 1991) was a Chilean football defender who played for Chile in the 1962 FIFA World Cup. He also played for Club Universidad de Chile.

Personal life

References

External links

1940 births
1991 deaths
Footballers from Santiago
Chilean footballers
Chile international footballers
Association football defenders
Universidad de Chile footballers
Santiago Morning footballers
Colo-Colo footballers
Chilean Primera División players
1962 FIFA World Cup players